In a Time of Blood and Fire is the debut album by Swedish power metal band Nocturnal Rites, released in 1995.

In 2005, the album was re-issued as a two-disc compilation titled, Lost in Time: The Early Years of Nocturnal Rites. The compilation featured previously unreleased demos and acoustic re-recordings.

Track listing
"Sword of Steel" – 3:21
"Skyline Flame" – 5:30
"Black Death" – 4:08
"In a Time of Blood and Fire"  – 5:01
"Dawnspell" - 5:38
"Lay of Ennui" – 5:02
"Winds of Death" – 4:17
"Rest in Peace" – 3:37 
"Dragonisle" – 6:53

2005 Re-issue bonus tracks
 Lay Of Ennui (demo)
 In A Time Of Blood And Fire (2004 version)
 Winds Of Death (2004 version)

Personnel
Anders Zackrisson - lead and backing vocals
Fredrik Mannberg - lead guitar
Mikael Söderström- rhythm guitar
Nils Eriksson - bass
Ulf Andersson - drums
Mattias Bernhardsson - keyboards

References

1997 albums
Nocturnal Rites albums